The Flying Doctor is a 1936 Australian-British drama film directed by Miles Mander and starring Charles Farrell, Mary Maguire and James Raglan. The Royal Flying Doctor Service of Australia operate in the Australian Outback.  Noted as Australia's first "sound" feature film, The Flying Doctor was also the country's first feature-length film based on aviation.

Plot
On his wedding night, Sandy Nelson (Charles Farrell) decides to abandon his young bride, Jenny (Mary Maguire) to go work in Sydney as a painter on the Harbour Bridge. He befriends a doctor, John Vaughan (James Raglan), who is in love with a married woman. Vaughan decides to acquire his flying license in order to accept a job as flying doctor in the outback.

Sandy gets in a brawl at a cricket match, serves time in prison, then heads for the outback and discovers gold. He is shot in a barroom fight and loses his eyesight. He then discovers Vaughan has fallen in love with Jenny, his former bride. When he realises Jenny loves Vaughan, Sandy decides to kill himself, leaving his fortune to the Flying Doctors.

Cast

 Charles Farrell as Sandy Nelson
 Mary Maguire as Jenny Rutherford
 James Raglan as Doctor John Vaughan
 Joe Valli as Dodger Green
 Margaret Vyner as Betty Webb
 Eric Colman as Geoffrey Webb
 Tom Lurich as Blotch Burns
 Maudie Edwards as Phyllis
 Katie Towers as Mrs. O'Toole
 Phillip Lytton as Doctor Gordon Rutherford
 Andrew Beresford as John Rutherford
 Jack Clarke as Pop Schnitzel
 Phil Smith as Barman Joe
 Donald Bradman as Himself
 William Hartnell as Abe McKeller

Production

National Productions
The Flying Doctor was the first and only production from National Productions, a new Australian film production company which was formed in the 1930s under the management of Frederick Daniell, a promoter involved with radio and newspaper companies in Sydney. Amongst its directors were Sir Hugh Denison, Sir Samuel Walder and Sir James Murdoch.

The company was closely associated with National Studios Ltd, which built a large studio complex in Pagewood, Sydney. It was incorporated in September 1935 with capital of £50,000.

Pre-production
National Productions had links to the British company, Gaumont British, which had been interested in making a film in Australia for a long time, with Robert Flaherty intending to shoot one.<ref>"Making films in Australia." Adelaide, Australia: The Mail, 7 September 1935, p. 3 via National Library of Australia. Retrieved: 19 February 2012.</ref> Gaumont provided technical and financial support for the company.

Gaumont British provided several personnel for the film, including the director, writer, cinematographer, unit manager and sound recordist. National Productions also hired Englishman Errol Hinds to be head of the camera department for two years.

The British unit arrived in November 1935." Film experts."  The Sydney Morning Herald, 13 November 1935, p. 9 via National Library of Australia. Retrieved: 19 February 2012. In December, American star Charles Farrell was signed to play the lead. He did not arrive until late January 1936.

Shooting
Shooting began in 1936 with bad weather helping the budget increase. The film was shot at National Studio's Pagewood facility. Director Miles Mander left for Hollywood in March 1936, leaving J.O.C. Orton to finish the film.

Reception
Mary Maguire lived in Brisbane, so it was decided to hold the film's international premiere there. 20th Century-Fox agreed to distribute the film free of charge. Box office receipts were poor but the release of the film led to a flood of donations to the flying doctors. Reviews were patchy. Aviation film historian Stephen Pendo in Aviation in the Cinema (1985), described The Flying Doctor as "lackluster."

Gaumont British decided not to distribute the film in the UK and it was done by General Film Distributors. The Flying Doctor was never released in the USA.

National Productions had prior to shooting announced intention to make three more films but none of these were made.

Preservation statusThe Flying Doctor was thought to have been lost until workmen clearing a building site in the Sydney suburb of Fig Tree uncovered a film vault. They cut through the steel door using an oxy torch – somehow avoiding igniting the highly flammable nitrate film inside – and loaded a truck with the contents to take away for disposal. An office worker saw the truck drive by, loaded with film cans, gave chase in his car, and rescued the film, which included the first eight of nine reels of The Flying Doctor. Two years later, the BFI National Film Archive in London found a copy of the shortened, re-edited British release of the film, also eight reels long, in the possession of a large film company. Despite this print having been "totally rearranged", the last reel was found to take up exactly where the Australian one left off.

References
Notes

Citations

Bibliography

 Beck, Simon D. The Aircraft-Spotter's Film and Television Companion. Jefferson, North Carolina: McFarland & Company, 2016. .
 Edmondson, Ray and Pike, Andrew. [http://www.nla.gov.au/sites/default/files/australias_lost_films.pdf Australia's Lost Films (PDF).] Parkes, Australia: National Library of Australia, 1982.
 Paris, Michael. From the Wright Brothers to Top Gun: Aviation, Nationalism, and Popular Cinema. Manchester, UK: Manchester University Press, 1995. .
 Pendo, Stephen. Aviation in the Cinema. Lanham, Maryland: Scarecrow Press, 1985. .
 Pike, Andrew and Ross Cooper. Australian Film 1900–1977: A Guide to Feature Film Production. Melbourne: Oxford University Press, 1998. .

External links
 The Flying Doctor at National Film and Sound Archive
 The Flying Doctor at Oz Movies

1936 films
1936 drama films
Australian drama films
British drama films
Australian aviation films
Films directed by Miles Mander
Gainsborough Pictures films
1930s rediscovered films
Australian black-and-white films
Rediscovered British films
Rediscovered Australian films
1930s English-language films
1930s British films